Hereford is a census-designated place in Hereford Township, Berks County, Pennsylvania, United States.  The community lies at the intersection of Pennsylvania Routes 29 and 100, which connect it to East Greenville and to Pottstown, respectively to the south. These routes continue north on Chestnut Street to Shimerville in Lehigh County, where 29 continues toward Allentown. The Perkiomen Creek flows southward through Hereford to the Schuylkill River.

Demographics
In the 2020 census, the population was 933.

History
A post office called Hereford was in operation from 1830 to 2019. The community took its name from Hereford Township. It was previously known as Treichlersville. At the end of March 2019 the post office closed on very short notice because the owner refused to renew the lease. The post office has since moved from the same building as Turkey Hill to the fire station building.

References

Census-designated places in Berks County, Pennsylvania
Census-designated places in Pennsylvania